African Nigeria Grant (born August 2, 1965) is a former professional American football player who played defensive back for one season for the Miami Dolphins His daughter Nia Grant is a middle blocker for Penn State Nittany Lions women's volleyball

References

1965 births
American football safeties
Illinois Fighting Illini football players
Miami Dolphins players
Living people